The Southern Moreton Bay Islands, abbreviated as the SMBI, also known as the Bay Islands, or the RKLM, are the four inhabited southern Moreton Bay islands located in South East Queensland, Australia. However, nearly one-third of all dwellings on the islands were unoccupied, suggesting a high proportion of "second homes" that are owned by people who were elsewhere on the night of the census.

Geography
Tiny Perulpa Island is joined by a causeway to Macleay and is generally regarded as part of Macleay.

The inhabited Southern Moreton Bay Islands are mostly surrounded by the Southern Moreton Bay Islands National Park, which is also located within Redland City.

History
The population of the four inhabited Bay Islands in 2006:
Karragarra, 125
Lamb, 373
Russell, 1,776
Macleay, population 1,957
In 2007, after a national A Current Affair television news segment, the islands received an enormous amount of interest as having the cheapest land in Australia.

The population of the four inhabited Bay Islands in 2016:
Karragarra, 204
Lamb, 432
Russell, 2,836
Macleay, population 2,681

Originally subdivided in the early 1970s, a bridge was promised by the then government. This never eventuated and residents are now feeling the pressure of transport to the mainland for some shopping trips, as mainland parking has become very scarce.

The Bay Islands enjoy a quiet, relaxed lifestyle with many retirees, pensioners and more recently, an influx of younger families looking for some safety and security, away from the hustle and bustle of the mainland.

Heritage listings
Lamb Island has a number of heritage-listed sites, including:
 Lucas Drive: Lamb Island Pioneer Hall
 Mango Trees on Tina Avenue which were planted over 100 years ago
 Jetty Shed which has been restored by the local island community group and was used for loading local produce onto the merchant boats

Macleay Island has a number of heritage-listed sites, including:
 Cliff Terrace: Industrial Ruins, Macleay Island

Amenities
Russell and Macleay have most basic services such as supermarkets, restaurants, primary schools, doctors, police, ambulance, fire brigade, SES, clubs and pubs. Lamb Island has a kiosk with basic supplies and convenience items. Karragarra has no shops at all, which is preferred by the residents.

Transportation

The islands have a frequent scheduled vehicle barge provided by Stradbroke Ferries and fast passenger ferries services provided by Bay Islands Transit, leaving from Redland Bay. Passenger services from Redland Bay to the islands were added to the TransLink network in 2013, allowing passengers to use go cards to ride the ferries. The ferries all have allocated space for bicycles, making cycling a very viable mode of transport on the islands. The TransLink ferry travels along two routes, called "clockwise" and "counter-clockwise", with the "clockwise" ferries traversing the ferry terminals in the following order:

 Redland Bay
 Karragarra (not serviced by every third ferry)
 Macleay
 Lamb (not serviced by every third ferry)
 Russell

Upon arrival at Russell Island, the ferry transfers to the counter-clockwise route, doing the same stops in reverse order. The first ferry departs Redland Bay at 04:45 on weekdays, and at 05:30 on weekends. The last ferry departs at 19:15 on weekdays and at 16:45 on weekends. The full journey from Redland Bay to Russell Island, or vice versa, takes approximately an hour.

The spectacular Canaipa Passage between North Stradbroke and Russell is a favourite destination for private boats.

Telecommunications

The Four Islands are served by two telephone exchanges. Macleay and Lamb Islands are served by the Macleay Island Exchange, while Karragarra and Russell Islands are served by Russell Island Exchange.

The exchanges do not have direct backhaul to the mainland, but are instead connected via microwave relay to other larger exchanges. Call Handling is done by the Woolloongabba Exchange.

ADSL Internet has been available to the Islands from 2004/2005 and are capable of ADSL2+ Speeds. Wireless broadband is available, however several residents report poor reception in some 'bushy' areas. This was combated on Macleay Island by having the Radio Masts raised slightly.

Due to the small size of the exchange footprint on Russell and Karragarra Islands, some residents are not able to receive ADSL, this is due to the copper line's length being beyond maximum standards (5 km). This mainly affects people living off Centre Road and Canaipa Road, in the northeast of the island. Residents have lobbied Telstra to install roadside cabinets at some of the worst affected areas, so that they can receive internet services, but these requests have been repeatedly ignored. Most residents outside the exchange footprint for ADSL have to resort to wireless broadband, and in many cases satellite internet. This also applies to Macleay and Lamb Islands as well.

Foxtel Digital PayTV is available via satellite.

The National Broadband Network became available on the islands in June 2020, in both fibre to the curb and fibre to the node, depending on the street.

See also

 List of islands of Queensland

References

External links
Redland City Council Homepage
Russell Island Wetlands

Islands of Moreton Bay
Redland City